Rocio Ocanto (born 6 September 1992) is an Argentinian team handball player.

Overview 
She plays for the club Lujan, and on the Argentine national team. She represented Argentina at the 2013 World Women's Handball Championship in Serbia.

References

Argentine female handball players
1992 births
Living people
21st-century Argentine women